Zoan or Tso'an (Hebrew: צֹועַן Ṣōʕan) was, according to the Hebrew Bible, a city of Egypt in the eastern Nile delta. Book of Numbers 13:22 says that it was built seven years after Hebron was built. Psalm 78:12,43 identifies the "field of Zoan" as the location where Moses performed miracles before a biblical Pharaoh to persuade him to release the Israelites from his service. The city is also mentioned in Book of Isaiah 19:11, 13, Isaiah 30:4 and Book of Ezekiel 30:14. 

The Greek Septuagint in all of these verses uses the Greek name Tánis. Both Tanis and Tso'an are ultimately derived from the Ancient Egyptian name for Tanis, ḏꜥn.t (Bohairic Coptic ϫⲁⲛⲓ; Sahidic Coptic ϫⲁⲁⲛⲉ; Modern Arabic صان Ṣan).

References

Torah cities
Hebrew Bible cities
Egypt in the Hebrew Bible
Nile Delta
Book of Numbers
Psalms
Book of Isaiah
Book of Ezekiel
Tanis